Christapor Mikaelian (Armenian: , Krisdapor Mikaelyan/Chrisdapor Mikaelian; 18 October 1859 – 17 March 1905), also known by his noms de guerre Hellen, Topal, and Edward, was one of the three founders of the Armenian Revolutionary Federation along with Stepan Zorian (Rostom) and Simon Zavarian and a major figure of the Armenian national liberation movement.

Early life
Mikaelian was born in the village of Agulis in the Nakhichevansky Uyezd of the Erivan Governorate of the Russian Empire, now part of Nakhchivan, Azerbaijan. His father was highly respected by the villagers, who considered him as the village judge and would bring their disputes to his arbitration. Mikaelian lost his mother at the age of four, and his father at the age of ten. He graduated from the local school with flying colors, and so the administration offered him a scholarship to the state pedagogical institute of Tiflis (modern-day Tbilisi, Georgia, on the condition that he then return to take a teaching position at the village school. He departed to Tiflis in 1874, but was not accepted into the academy until 1876, at the age of seventeen. He became an active member of the revolutionary organization Narodnaya Volya (People's Will), which was widespread amongst student circles. He read all the revolutionary literature he could get his hands on, and was especially influenced by the works of Welsh social reformer Robert Owen.

In 1880 he graduated from the pedagogical institute of Tiflis, returning to his hometown and honoring his agreement to teach at the village school. In 1884 he returned to Tiflis and found the student organization Armenian Patriotic Union (Միութիւն Հայրենասիրաց, Miutiun Hayrenasirats) in disarray. He managed to gather some of the members along with some laborers and gave them lectures, taught them primary subjects and language, and on Sundays trained them in the use of weapons. From this group prominent Armenian revolutionary figures such as Arabo and Markar Varjabedian emerged. Mikaelian was also preoccupied with educating older student groups, whom he educated in sociology. At that time he also became interested in Armenian issues, and paid visits to the famous Armenian patriotic intellectuals Raffi and Grigor Artsruni.

In 1885 the tsarist government closed down 400 Armenian schools, which left around 20,000 students and 2,000 teachers without occupation. Mikaelian and his comrades distribute flyers of protest, but met little success. In the autumn of 1885, Mikaelian departed to Moscow to continue his studies at the Petrovskaya Agricultural Academy. Raffi recommended him to his friend Melkon Kasbarian Paniants, asking him to aid Mikaelian financially, adding, "You can believe me in regards to his morality, that he is a most honorable youth." For a year and a half Mikaelian attended the Petrovskaya Agricultural Academy, where he met Stepan Zorian (Rostom) and Simon Zavarian. He took courses as an auditing student, simultaneously pursuing studies in scientific and economic issues and actively participating in student movements. Due to lack of financial means, Mikaelian left his studies incomplete and in 1887 returned to Tiflis and committed himself to revolutionary activities. He attempted to found a secret printing-house with Rostom, but they were unable to secure sufficient funds.

Political activism

Upon his return to Tiflis, he organized, trained, and taught groups of people belonging to the working class. In order to mobilize the dispersed Armenian fedayees, he founded an organization known as Young Armenia (Երիտասարդ Հայաստան, Yeritasard Hayastan). He later became a co-founder of the ARF alongside Simon Zavarian and Stepan Zorian. He was one of the members of the ARF Bureau until his death. 

In 1891, he was deported by the Russian authorities to Kishinev in Bessarabia. He then made his way to Galatz, Romania, where he participated in the production of Droshak, the official newspaper of the ARF. Mikaelian returned to the Caucasus in 1892 and continued his activities there until 1898. He was jailed for six months by the Russian authorities in 1895. He went to Geneva in 1898 to edit Droshak. Mikaelian played an instrumental role in the creation of the bi-monthly Pro Armenia in 1900, a publication which brought together French intellectuals sympathetic to the Armenian cause. From 1901 to 1904, Mikaelian conducted the Potorik ("Storm") operation to extort money for the ARF from wealthy Armenians. Mikaelian was the central figure of the planning of the assassination attempt on Ottoman Sultan Abdul Hamid II, the ultimately unsuccessful Yıldız assassination attempt. However, he died while testing bombs for the attempt in the mountain village of Sablyar, near Kyustendil in Bulgaria. He was 45 years old.

References

Bibliography

 Mihran Kurdoghlian, Badmoutioun Hayots, C. Hador (translators from the Armenian), Armenian History, volume III, p. 34, Athens, Greece: 1996 
 The Book of The Tashnagtsagan Badanee Volume I., p 58–61, Los Angeles: 2007
 Գաբրիէլ Լազեան, Յեղափոխական Դէմքեր (Մտաւորականներ, Հայդուկներ), էջ 3–15, Մոնթէպէլլօ, Քալիֆորնիայ: Հ.Յ.Դ. «Դրօ» Կոմիտէութիւն, 1994 (Kapriel Lazian, Revolutionary Figures (Intellectuals, Freedom Fighters), p. 3-15, Montebello, CA: A.R.F. "Tro" Chapter, 1994)

See also
 Armenian Revolutionary Federation
 Stepan Zorian
 Simon Zavarian

1905 deaths
1859 births
People from the Nakhchivan Autonomous Republic
Armenian revolutionaries
Armenian independence activists